Interstate 235 (I-235) in Iowa is an auxiliary Interstate Highway that runs just north of downtown Des Moines through the heart of the Des Moines metropolitan area. I-235 runs from the junction of I-35 and I-80 in West Des Moines to the separation of the same two Interstates in Ankeny.

I-235, which had seen little improvement since its construction in the 1960s, was completely rebuilt and widened in a project that spanned most of the 2000s. Prior to the reconstruction, I-235 had two lanes in each direction with a third lane near downtown; the entire route now has at least three lanes of traffic in each direction, with an additional one or two lanes closer to the heart of the city. The modernized freeway now handles on average between 75,000 and 125,000 vehicles per day, making it the busiest highway in the state of Iowa.

Route description
I-235 begins at the western intersection of I-35 and I-80, known locally as the West Mixmaster. Here, eastbound I-80 exits the highway, which becomes I-235 and joins northbound I-35. From the West interchange, I-235 heads east. Almost immediately is a half diamond interchange with 50th Street in West Des Moines at exit 1A.  later is a partial cloverleaf interchange at exit 1B with Valley West Drive, which was renamed from 35th Street in 1988 due to its proximity to Valley West Mall and Valley High School.

At Windsor Heights at a tight partial cloverleaf interchange, I-235 meets 73rd Street/8th Street at exit 3. The interchange is particularly tight because of an Iowa Interstate Railroad line just to the east. 73rd Street/8th Street are actually a single road: north of I-235, 73rd Street follows the Des Moines street numbering plan, while south of I-235, 8th Street follows the older street numbering plan of West Des Moines. 

At the Iowa Highway 28 (Iowa 28)/63rd Street interchange (exit 4), I-235 picks up a fourth lane of eastbound travel and drops a lane westbound. Now within the city limits of Des Moines, it passes the through the heavily wooded Waterbury neighborhood. Near the 42nd Street interchange (exit 5B, I-235 curves to the south around Theodore Roosevelt High School. An interchange with 31st Street is  later at exit 6, which provides access to Drake University to the north, and to Terrace Hill, the governor's mansion, to the south.

East of 31st Street, I-235 briefly picks up a fifth lane and drops a lane westbound, creating a 10-lane freeway just west of downtown. This stretch of freeway receives, on average, over 125,000 vehicles per day, making it the busiest stretch of road in the state.  

There are three eastbound interchanges connecting I-235 to downtown Des Moines. From exit 7A, Martin Luther King Jr. Parkway and 19th Street, a pair of oneway streets, lead traffic to the west of downtown. From exit 7B, Keosauqua Way, known locally as Keo Way, enters downtown from the northwest. These interchanges are combined westbound at exit 7. Closer to the Des Moines River, a combined interchange in each direction (exit 8A) filters off the rest of downtown traffic to two destinations: 7th Street and 6th Avenue and 3rd Street and 2nd Avenue, each of which are pairs of oneway streets. The fourth lane of traffic drops off at this combined interchange.

At the Des Moines River, I-235 passes Wells Fargo Arena, the main Iowa Events Center facility, which lies to the south along the western bank and the Greater Des Moines Botanical Garden to the north on the eastern bank. On the eastside of Des Moines, it skirts the northern edge of the East Village, the Iowa State Capitol, and East High School before the interchange with U.S. Highway 69 (US 69) at East 14th Street and East 15th Street .  east is an interchange with Iowa 163/East University Avenue at exit 10A. Up to now, East University Avenue had been relatively parallel to I-235. It also provides access to the Iowa State Fairgrounds for northbound I-35 and eastbound I-80 traffic.

At Iowa 163, I-235 begins curving to the north, dividing an industrial district to the west and residential areas to the east. It intersects US 6/East Euclid Avenue at a partial cloverleaf interchange (exit 12)  to the north. It continues north for another  until it meets I-35 and I-80 again at the East interchange.

History

The first section of I-235 to open, from Cottage Grove Avenue to Keo Way, opened on December 14, 1961. Over the next seven years, sections of I-235 opened, spreading east and west toward the interchanges until it was completed on October 30, 1968. Construction of the freeway required the acquisition of 1,650 parcels, the demolition of three schools and seven churches, and closure of the original Des Moines Golf and Country Club.

In October 1963, the Des Moines city council designated I-235 the John MacVicar Freeway in honor of two former mayors of Des Moines: John MacVicar Sr. (1896–1900, 1916–1918, 1928) and John MacVicar Jr. (1942–1948). However, this name is seldom used; most people simply refer to it as I-235.

In March 2002, a six-year-long project to completely rebuild I-235 and the bridges which cross it began. The first two years consisted of rebuilding most of the bridges which cross it, starting with 42nd Street in West Des Moines. The final four years of the project entailed finishing the remaining bridges and widening, regrading, and repaving the entire length of the highway.

Pedestrian bridges
An additional part of the highway improvement plan were three pedestrian bridges, located at 40th, 44th, and East 6th streets. The three bridges were replacements for bridges which were too narrow to accommodate the newly widened highway. These highly visible bridges act as icons, locating the neighborhoods for travelers along the freeway. The design of the I-235 pedestrian bridges was completed by Boston-based bridge designer Miguel Rosales in collaboration with HNTB Engineering. The three bridges, the Edna M. Griffin Memorial Bridge (East 6th Street), the 40th Street Pedestrian Bridge, and the Rider Way Pedestrian Bridge (44th Street) were each completed by 2005.

Inclined cables connect the steel blue arches to the prestressed concrete deck. By selecting a tied arch form, the Iowa Department of Transportation was able to keep disruption of traffic to a minimum during construction. An innovative curved screen system is used to enhance security and the appearance of the structure creating a visually appealing experience for pedestrians and bicyclists using the bridge. The resulting series of bridges has created a distinctive form that is unique to the city and the state.

Exit list

References

External links

 I-235 history
 I-235 photo gallery
 

35-2
35-2 Iowa
2 Iowa
Transportation in Des Moines, Iowa
235 Iowa
Articles containing video clips
Transportation in Polk County, Iowa